Kentucky elected its members August 3, 1829, after the term began but before the new Congress convened.

See also 
 1828 and 1829 United States House of Representatives elections
 List of United States representatives from Kentucky

Notes 

1829
Kentucky
United States House of Representatives